Leo Nagornoff (16 January 1925 – 2011) was a Finnish sailor. He competed in the Dragon event at the 1952 Summer Olympics.

References

External links
 

1925 births
2011 deaths
Finnish male sailors (sport)
Olympic sailors of Finland
Sailors at the 1952 Summer Olympics – Dragon
Sportspeople from Helsinki